Massimo Carrera (born 22 April 1964) is an Italian professional football manager and former player, who was most recently the manager of clubs Spartak Moscow and later AEK Athens, before leaving continental football and joining local club Bari in Serie C. Nicknamed La Bandera, he played as a defender for various European clubs, including Juventus, which he later managed, and the Italy national team.

Club career
Carrera began his career at Pro Sesto, but rose to fame with Bari, enjoying five seasons with the club before moving to Juventus in 1991. Under manager Giovanni Trapattoni, he was deployed at right back, a role he had also held at Bari. He disputed an excellent first season, culminating with being called up for the Italy national team. In his second season, he won the UEFA Cup with the club.

Carrera unwittingly played a huge role in helping Milan go unbeaten in the 1991–92 Serie A season. During injury time of Juventus' home match against Milan on 15 September 1991, an innocent-looking cross from the right touchline hit Carrera's head, and the ball looped past a stranded Stefano Tacconi for the crucial equaliser. Milan would then go on to finish the season unbeaten, and embark on a record-breaking 58-match unbeaten streak.

In 1994, with the arrival of Marcello Lippi, he was deployed as a sweeper, in place of Luca Fusi, and subsequently as a central defender, becoming a pillar of the team, and winning both Serie A and the Coppa Italia in 1995. Carrera also reached the UEFA Cup final at the end of the season.

Due to the arrival of skilled defenders Pietro Vierchowod and Paolo Montero the following season, Carrera started more often from the bench, but still offered valued contribution when called upon.

After 166 caps with Juventus, and having won Serie A, the Coppa Italia, the Supercoppa Italiana, the UEFA Champions League and the UEFA Cup, he transferred to Atalanta in the summer of 1996.

Carrera quickly became captain and leader of the Orobici, playing there for eight seasons and totaling 207 caps and three goals. He left Bergamo in 2003 to join Napoli, and the following season, he settled in Treviso.

He stayed in Veneto for just a season, and on 28 October 2005, at the age of 41, Carrera signed for Pro Vercelli.

At the end of the 2007–08 season, at the age of 44, Carrera decided to retire from playing football to focus on coaching.

International career
Carrera's excellent performances with Juventus in his first year with the club earned him his first international call-up under manager Arrigo Sacchi in 1991; Carrera later made his debut and only appearance with the Italy national team on 19 February 1992, in a 4–0 friendly win against San Marino at the Stadio Dino Manuzzi in Cesena.

Managerial career

Juventus
Carrera was reunited with former Juventus teammates Antonio Conte and Angelo Alessio in the summer of 2011 when he joined the club's coaching staff as a technical director.

Due to a ten-month ban against head coach Conte for alleged implications of his failure to report match fixing and a similar ban against his assistant Alessio, Carrera became Juventus' caretaker manager in July 2012. In his first official match, he claimed the 2012 Supercoppa Italiana defeating Napoli in Beijing, winning 4–2 after extra time. After Alessio's ban was removed, Carrera returned to the position of technical director, leaving the bench to Alessio.

Spartak Moscow
Before the 2016–17 season, Carrera was hired as an assistant manager for the Russian side FC Spartak Moscow. When previous manager Dmitri Alenichev left the club on 5 August 2016 after Spartak's elimination from the UEFA Europa League by AEK Larnaca, Carrera was appointed the caretaker manager. On 17 August 2016, he was hired as Spartak's manager on a permanent basis, making his debut on 21 August against Krasnodar, where red-white captured their first victory 2–0. No other Spartak head coach managed to start their work as successfully as Carrera did: Spartak collected 28 of 36 points in first twelve matches under him. On 7 May 2017, Spartak secured their first Russian Premier League title since 2001 under Carrera's leadership. On 6 June 2017, he extended his Spartak contract to 31 May 2019.

He was relieved of his duties in late 2018 following a number of poor performances, despite remaining seemingly popular among the fans, a move that caused controversy. In particular, many accused captain Denis Glushakov of actively supporting the decision and called for his removal from the team.

AEK Athens
On 8 December 2019, Carrera was unveiled as the new manager of Super League Greece club AEK Athens.

Massimo Carrera succeed to bring AEK Athens to qualify for the UEFA Europa League in the season 2020–21 after beating VfL Wolfsburg at the Play-off round for 2–1 at the Athens Olympic Stadium getting in the Group stage.

Bari
On 9 February 2021, Carrera was hired as new head coach of Serie C club Bari. He was dismissed just two months later, on 19 April 2021, following a last-minute home draw against Palermo, leaving Bari in third place with two games to go.

Managerial statistics

Honours

Player
Bari
Serie B: 1988–89
Mitropa Cup: 1990

Juventus
Serie A: 1994–95
Coppa Italia: 1994–95
Supercoppa Italiana: 1995
UEFA Champions League: 1995–96
UEFA Cup: 1992–93

Manager
Juventus
Supercoppa Italiana: 2012

Spartak Moscow
Russian Premier League: 2016–17
Russian Super Cup: 2017

Individual
Russian Premier League Coach of the Year: 2016–17

References

External links

 

Massimo Carrera at Myjuve.it 
Massimo Carrera at the Italian Football Federation 

1964 births
Living people
People from Sesto San Giovanni
Association football defenders
Delfino Pescara 1936 players
S.S.C. Bari players
Juventus F.C. players
Atalanta B.C. players
S.S.C. Napoli players
Treviso F.B.C. 1993 players
F.C. Pro Vercelli 1892 players
Italian footballers
U.S. Alessandria Calcio 1912 players
Serie A players
Serie B players
Serie C players
Serie D players
Italy international footballers
S.S.D. Pro Sesto players
U.S. Russi players
Juventus F.C. non-playing staff
Italian football managers
Juventus F.C. managers
FC Spartak Moscow managers
AEK Athens F.C. managers
Russian Premier League managers
Super League Greece managers
S.S.C. Bari managers
Italian expatriate football managers
Italian expatriate sportspeople in Russia
Italian expatriate sportspeople in Greece
Expatriate football managers in Russia
Expatriate football managers in Greece
UEFA Cup winning players
UEFA Champions League winning players
Footballers from Lombardy
Sportspeople from the Metropolitan City of Milan